Dalziel, Dalzell, Dezell, or Dalyell is a Scottish surname.

Pronunciation
The unintuitive spelling of the name is due to it being an anglicisation of Scottish Gaelic Dail-gheal, meaning bright dale.

History
The name originates from the former barony of Dalzell in Lanarkshire, in the area now occupied by Motherwell. The name Dalzell is first recorded in 1259, and Thomas de Dalzell fought at Bannockburn. The Dalzell lands were forfeited later in the 14th century, but regained through marriage in the 15th. Sir Robert Dalzell was created Lord Dalzell in 1628, and his son was further elevated in the peerage as Earl of Carnwath, in 1639. In 1645 the Dalzell estates were sold to the Hamiltons of Orbiston, who held them until the 20th century. Scottish emigration has dispersed the Dalziel family across the English-speaking world.

The Dalziel coat of arms is sable, a man's body proper, i.e. the flesh-coloured silhouette of a man against a black background. The origin of this peculiar arms was written about by Sir Robert Douglas, 6th Baronet, in 1764:

People
People with this surname include:

Dalyell
 Dalyell baronets
 Sir John Graham Dalyell (1775–1851), Scottish antiquary and naturalist
 Tam Dalyell of the Binns (1615–1685), Scottish General, also spelled Dalzell or Dalziel
 Tam Dalyell (1932–2017), British Labour politician
 Elsie Dalyell (1881–1948), Australian pathologist

Dalzell
 John Dalzell (1845–1927), U.S. Representative 
 Rick Dalzell (born 1957), American businessman 
 Samuel 'Sammy' Dalzell (1933-1977), Olympic Athlete (Northern Ireland) 
 Stewart Dalzell (1943-2019), American judge

Dalziel
 Bobby Dalziel, Scottish footballer
 Brothers Dalziel, a firm of Victorian engravers founded in 1839 by George and Edward Dalziel, and assisted by John and Thomas Dalziel (see below)
 Charles Dalziel (1904–1986), American professor of engineering
 Dale Dalziel, American curler
 Davison Dalziel, 1st Baron Dalziel of Wooler (1852–1928), Scottish businessman and Conservative politician
 Diana Vreeland (1903–1989), born Diana Dalziel, noted fashion magazine editor
 Gordon Dalziel (born 1962), former Scottish footballer and manager
 Henry Dalziel (1893–1965), Australian war hero
 Henry Dalziel, 1st Baron Dalziel of Kirkcaldy (1868–1935), Scottish Liberal politician
 Ian Dalziel (born 1947), British businessman and politician
 John Dalziel, Scottish rugby union coach
 Kathleen Dalziel (1881–1969), Australian poet
 Keith Dalziel (1921–1994), Biochemist and Fellow of The Royal Society
 Lianne Dalziel (born 1960), Mayor of Christchurch, New Zealand
 Margaret Dalziel, academic at the University of Otago, New Zealand
 Raewyn Dalziel, New Zealand historian
 Ryan Dalziel (born 1982), British racing driver
 Stuart Dalziel (born 1963), British and New Zealand fluid dynamicist
 Thomas Dalziel (1823–1906), engraver

Fictional people
 Andrew Dalziel, fictitious detective in literature and television, part of the team Dalziel and Pascoe created by Reginald Hill.
 Royce Varisey, tenth Duke of Wolverstone went by the codename 'Dalziel' (his mother's family name) throughout the Napoleonic Wars in the Bastion Club series of romance novels by Stephanie Laurens.
 The would-be heroic Willie Dalzel, a boy of about six or eight and friend to Jimmie Trescott, is a minor character in Stephen Crane's novella, The Monster (1898).
 Clay Dalzell, lawyer/detective played by William Powell in the movie, "Star of Midnight" (1936), based upon the novel by Arthur Roche.

People with the given name
 Dalziel Hammick (1887–1966), British chemist

Other uses
Motherwell still contains Dalziel Parish, a congregation of the Church of Scotland, as well as the Dalzell Steelworks, now owned by Liberty House. The estate of Dalziel House, the former home of the Baron Hamilton of Dalzell, is now a country park on the south side of the town. Dalziel Rugby Club play at Dalziel Park in nearby Carfin. The name is also used by several Motherwell-based institutions, including Dalziel High School and the former Dalziel Co-operative Society. Dalziel Park Stadium was a nineteenth-century football stadium that was the home of the town's football team Motherwell F.C.

See also
 Dalzell (disambiguation)

References

External links
Dalziel - the name the place
Dalziel.com

Surnames
Scottish surnames
Anglicised Scottish Gaelic-language surnames
Surnames of Lowland Scottish origin